Lisa Carmella McClain ( Iovannisci; born April 7, 1966) is an American politician who serves as the U.S. representative for  since 2021 (known as the 10th congressional district until 2023). A member of the Republican Party, she won election to the state's redrawn 9th district in the 2022 election.

Early life and career
McClain was born and raised in Stockbridge, Michigan. She graduated from Stockbridge Junior / Senior High School in 1984. She attended Lansing Community College and earned her Bachelor of Business Administration from Northwood University.

McClain worked at American Express for 11 years, and then joined the Hantz Group.

U.S. House of Representatives

Elections

2020 

She defeated state Representative Shane Hernandez in the August 4 Republican primary and Democratic nominee Kimberly Bizon in the November 3 general election. President Donald Trump endorsed McClain.

2022

McClain won election to the state's redrawn , defeating all other candidates with 63.9% of the vote. Democrat Brian Jaye finished second with 33.2% of the vote.

Committee assignments

 Committee on Armed Services
 Committee on Oversight and Accountability

Caucus memberships 

 Republican Main Street Partnership
Republican Study Committee

Political positions

Budget and spending
McClain, along with all other Senate and House Republicans, voted against the American Rescue Plan Act of 2021.

Marriage
McClain voted against the "Respect for Marriage Act" codifying Loving v. Virginia and Obergefell v. Hodges, recognizing marriages across state lines regardless of "sex, race, ethnicity, or national origin of those individuals."

2020 presidential election
On January 6, 2021, McClain voted against accepting Arizona's and Pennsylvania's electoral votes in the 2020 presidential election.

At a 2022 Trump rally, McClain falsely claimed that Trump had "caught Osama bin Laden" and won the 2020 election, and that the U.S. was not engaged in any wars during Trump's presidency.

Personal life
McClain and her husband, Mike, have three children, and live in Romeo, an outer northern suburb of Detroit. She has raised over $1 million for the treatment of multiple sclerosis. She is a Roman Catholic.

See also
Women in the United States House of Representatives

References

External links

 Representative Lisa McClain official U.S. House website
 Lisa McClain For Congress
 
 

|-

|-

|-

1966 births
21st-century American politicians
21st-century American women politicians
American Express people
American people of Italian descent
American Roman Catholics
Catholics from Michigan
Female members of the United States House of Representatives
Living people
Northwood University alumni
People from Ingham County, Michigan
People from Romeo, Michigan
Republican Party members of the United States House of Representatives from Michigan
Women in Michigan politics